Educational Research and Evaluation is a peer-reviewed academic journal covering research on all aspects of education and its evaluation. It is published by Routledge and the editors-in-chief are Gurpinder Singh Lalli (University of Wolverhampton) and Wei Zhang (University of Leicester) . The journal was established in 1995 and in 2012 absorbed Evaluation & Research in Education (1987-2011).

Abstracting and indexing
The journal is abstracted and indexed in:
Emerging Sources Citation Index
EBSCO databases
ProQuest databases
PsycINFO
Scopus

References

External links

Education journals
Routledge academic journals
8 times per year journals
English-language journals
Publications established in 1995